Charley Henley is a visual effects supervisor. He was nominated at the 85th Academy Awards for his work on the film Prometheus, in the category of Best Visual Effects. He shared his nomination with Martin Hill, Richard Stammers and Trevor Wood. He is the son of the actor Drewe Henley and actress Felicity Kendal.

Selected filmography

 Gladiator (2000)
 Harry Potter and the Philosopher's Stone (2001)
 A Knights Tale (2001)
 Lara Croft: Tomb Raider (2001)
 Harry Potter and the Chamber of Secrets (2002)
 Alien vs. Predator (2004)
 Ella Enchanted (2004)
 Harry Potter and the Prisoner of Azkaban (2004)
 Harry Potter and the Goblet of Fire (2005)
 X-Men: The Last Stand (2006)
 Harry Potter and the Order of the Phoenix (2007)
 The Chronicles of Narnia: Prince Caspian (2008)
 The Chronicles of Narnia: The Voyage of the Dawn Treader (2010)
 Prometheus (2012)
 Total Recall (2012)
 300: Rise of an Empire (2014)
 Cinderella (2015)

References

External links

Living people
Special effects people
Year of birth missing (living people)